Émile Renouf (23 June 1845 – 4 May 1894) was a French painter and draughtsman of the realism-impressionism school.

He studied at the Académie Julian and was a pupil of Gustave Boulanger, Jules Lefebvre and Charles Duran, and first exhibited his works at the Salon de peinture et de sculpture in Paris between 1877 and 1881. He received a gold medal at the Exposition Universelle (1889) in Paris.

He painted marine and peasant themes especially after a trip to the Île de Sein. Because of the state of his Paris studio, he built a new atelier in Le Havre where he died. His works are in museums in France, Amiens, Le Havre, Rouen, Liège and the Metropolitan Museum of Art in New York City.

Major works
Environs de Honfleur, printemps, 1870
Environs de Honfleur, le soir, 1875
Aux environs de Honfleur, l'hiver, 1877
Maison du Haut-du-Vent, à l'embouchure de la Seine, 1878
Lit de rivière dans un vallon, 1878, oil on canvas
La veuve de l'Île de Sein, 1880, Musée des beaux-arts de Quimper
Un coup de main or  La main tendue (The Helping Hand), 1881
Après un orage, 1881
Soleil couchant, 1884
Un loup de mer, 1885
En dérive, 1886
Fin du jour, 1886
Les guetteurs, 1889
 Le pont de Brookling, 1889
Pique-nique dans un parc
Bord de rivière, oil on canvas transferred to wood
, oil on canvas
Bord de plage, oil on canvas
Sur la montre (between 1880 and 1890) (inspired a work by George Emerick Essig)
Après la pluie, 1876
Soleil couchant, 1876
Une vallée dans le Finistère, 1877
Un sauvetage, 1883
Le pilote (Der Looste), 1883
Paysage (ruisseau) (Musée des beaux-arts de Liège)
Le canal d'Harfleur, 1892
Dernier radoub, gravure, 1885
La partie de pêche, 1892
Chutes du Niagara, 1893

Examples of his work

References

1845 births
1894 deaths
19th-century French painters
French male painters
French draughtsmen
Académie Julian alumni
19th-century French male artists